Sergey Piskunov  (born on April 9, 1989, Lysychansk) is a Ukrainian  hyperrealism painter.

Biography 
Sergey Piskunov was born on April 9, 1989, in the city of Lysychansk, Luhansk Oblast. Graduated from the Academy of the Customs Service of Ukraine (2012) with a degree in Computer Science. In the third year of the academy, he began to self study fine arts, after he received brushes and paints as a gift from his future wife. Until the fifth year, Sergey held his first personal exhibition, and before graduation, he had already held three of his own exhibitions.

Upon completion of the study, he received a referral for employment at the State Customs Service of Ukraine, the chief inspector of the department of information systems and customs statistics in Kyiv. From 2013 to 2016 he worked as a software tester for Sybase, Amadeus, GlobalLogic, and Ciklum. After that, he devoted himself entirely to art. His work from the "Golden Masks" series, for which model Dasha Astafieva posed, became the winner of the Artboxproject in Miami 2018. Piskunov was also the winner of the Artist of the Future nomination for the Artist of the Future Contemporary Art Curator Magazine and the finalist of the Artist of the Year in the CIRCLE foundation among 668 other artists.

In 2018, Canadian model Coco Rocha starred in a photoshoot for his paintings. Sergey Piskunov has published in specialized publications on hyperrealism. His work is featured in London's Plus One Gallery, which specializes in hyperrealism.

Exhibitions 
 2012 — Art Hall Gallery, Kyiv
 2013 — Museum of Hetmanate, Kyiv
 2013 — New Gallery, Kyiv
 2013 — group exhibition, Kyiv
 2013 — international Art Project, Kyiv
 2013 — New Natura Morta, Kyiv
 2013 — «Neo-Still Life», Expo Centre, Kyiv
 2013 — Palace of Art, Lviv 
 2013 — Labyrinth, International Exhibition Centre, Kyiv
 2013 — Heritage, International Exhibition Centre, Kyiv 
 2013 — exhibition of paintings Personal View, Art Development Foundation, Kyiv
 2013 — Museum of Spiritual Treasures of Ukraine 
 2013 — Independent Dependence, Expo Centre, Kyiv
 2013 — gallery «Lavra», Kyiv
 2014 — Kraft Foods, Kyiv
 2014 — group exhibition, Berlin 
 2015 — Zoom Gallery, Tel Aviv 
 2015 — Week of ART, London
 2015 — Art Affordable, Singapore 
 2015 — art project, M17 Gallery, Kyiv
 2016 — Museum Kavaleridze, Kyiv
 2016 — Artbox Gallery, Switzerland 
 2017 — 101 Gallerie, Mexico 
 2017 — Zoom Gallery, Tel Aviv 
 2018 — Bartoux Gallery, Paris 
 2018 — Platinum Gallery, United States 
 2019 — Miami Art Week, Artbox project - finalist 
 2019 — Center of Modern Art, Yantai 
 2020 — Finalist of Circle foundation of the Arts, Artist of the year award

References

External links

 
 
 
 
 
 
 
 
 

Interview
 
 
 
 

1989 births
Living people
People from Lysychansk
21st-century Ukrainian painters
21st-century Ukrainian male artists
Ukrainian painters
Ukrainian male painters